Patrycja Ewelina Harajda (born 24 February 1981) is a visually impaired Polish Paralympic swimmer.

References

1981 births
Living people
Paralympic swimmers of Poland
Swimmers at the 2000 Summer Paralympics
Swimmers at the 2004 Summer Paralympics
Swimmers at the 2008 Summer Paralympics
Medalists at the 2000 Summer Paralympics
Medalists at the 2004 Summer Paralympics
Paralympic medalists in swimming
Paralympic silver medalists for Poland
Paralympic bronze medalists for Poland
Polish female backstroke swimmers
Polish female medley swimmers
Medalists at the World Para Swimming Championships
S12-classified Paralympic swimmers
20th-century Polish women
21st-century Polish women